Leo IV is a dwarf spheroidal galaxy situated in the Leo constellation, discovered in 2006 in the data obtained by the Sloan Digital Sky Survey. The galaxy is located at the distance of about 160 kpc from the Sun and moves away from the Sun with the velocity of about 130 km/s. It is classified as a dwarf spheroidal galaxy (dSph) meaning that it has an approximately round shape with the half-light radius of about 130 pc.

Leo IV is one of the smallest and faintest satellites of the Milky Way; its integrated luminosity is about  times that of the Sun (absolute visible magnitude of ), which is much lower than the luminosity of a typical globular cluster. However, its mass is about 1.5 million solar masses, which means that Leo's mass to light ratio is around 150. A high mass to light ratio implies that Leo IV is dominated by the dark matter.

The stellar population of Leo IV consists mainly of old stars formed more than 12 billion years ago. The observed stars were primarily red giants, although a number of Horizontal branch stars including three RR Lyrae variable stars were also discovered. The stars of Leo IV were probably among the first stars to form in the Universe. Nevertheless, the detailed study of the stellar population revealed the presence of a small number of much younger stars with the age of about 2 billion years or less. This discovery points to a complicated star formation history of this galaxy. Currently there is no star formation in Leo IV. The measurements have so far failed to detect any neutral hydrogen in it—the upper limit is just 600 solar masses.

In 2008, another galaxy called Leo V was discovered in the vicinity of Leo IV. The former is located 20 kpc further from the Milky Way than the latter and 3 degrees (~ 10 kpc) away from it. These two galaxies may be physically associated with each other.

Notes

References

Dwarf spheroidal galaxies
4713561
Leo (constellation)
Local Group
Milky Way Subgroup
?